Cut Spelling is a system of English-language spelling reform which reduces redundant letters and makes substitutions to improve correspondence with the spoken word. It was designed by Christopher Upward and was for a time being popularized by the Simplified Spelling Society. The resulting words are 8–15% shorter than standard spellings. The name Cut Spelling was coined by psychologist Valerie Yule.

Unlike some other proposed reforms, Cut Spelling does not attempt to make English spelling phonemic, but merely attempts to remove many of the unneeded difficulties of the current spelling. Cut Spelling differs from "traditional orthography" mainly in removing letters from words and makes relatively few substitutions of letters compared with other proposed reforms. According to its designers, this allows readers accustomed to traditional orthography to get used to Cut Spelling fairly quickly and easily, while still giving learners of the language a much-simplified and more systematic spelling system.

Rules 
Cut Spelling uses three main reduction rules to convert traditional spellings into "cut spellings":

 Letters irrelevant to pronunciation. This rule deletes most silent letters, except when these letters (such as "magic e") help indicate pronunciation. Omitting or including the wrong silent letters are common errors. Examples: peace → pece, except → exept, plaque → plaq, blood → blod, pitch → pich.
 Cutting unstressed vowels. English unstressed syllables are usually pronounced with the vowel schwa , which has no standard spelling, but can be represented by any vowel letter. Writing the wrong letter in these syllables is a common error ─ for example, writing  for separate. Cut Spelling eliminates these vowel letters completely before approximants ( and ) and nasals (and ). In addition, some vowel letters are dropped in suffixes, reducing the confusion between -able and -ible. Examples: symbol → symbl, victim → victm, lemon → lemn, glamour/glamor → glamr, permanent → permnnt, waited → waitd, churches → churchs, warmest → warmst, edible → edbl.
 Simplifying doubled consonants. This rule helps with another of the most common spelling errors: failing to double letters (accommodate and committee are often misspelled) or introducing erroneously doubled letters. Cut Spelling does not eliminate all doubled letters: in some words (especially two-syllable words) the doubled consonant letter is needed to differentiate from another differently pronounced word (e.g., holly and holy). Examples: innate → inate, necessary → , spell → spel.

Substitution rules 
The Cut Spelling system also uses three substitution rules:
 The digraphs gh and ph become f when pronounced . Examples: draught → draft, sulphur → sulfr, photograph → fotograf.
Examples: judge → juj, rouge → ruje.
 The combinations ig and igh are changed to y when pronounced . Examples: flight → flyt, sign → syn.

The Cut Spelling Handbook also lists optional additional rules such as replacing ch with k when it makes the  sound, respelling as y unusual patterns that make the  diphthong, as well as replacing -tion, -cian, -sion, -ssion, etc. with -shn.

Examples 

 Note The example above assumes British pronunciation by abbreviating "military" to "militry".

See also
List of reforms of the English language
Spelling Reform 1 (SR1)
Handbook of Simplified Spelling
Traditional Spelling Revised

References

Sources

External links 
  The English Spelling Society - Books and papers Includes the Cut Spelling Handbook
 CutSpel Web browser extension to convert automatically convert standard English to Cut Spelling english. For Google Chrome.

English spelling reform